Harmony Tan (born 11 September 1997) is a French professional tennis player.

Tan has career-high WTA rankings of world No. 90 in singles and 302 in doubles. She has won eight singles titles and one doubles title on the ITF Women's Circuit.

Personal life
Harmony Tan is of Chinese Cambodian and Vietnamese
descent.

Career
Tan made her Grand Slam doubles main-draw debut at the 2017 French Open, after having been handed a wildcard to enter the tournament; she and her partner Audrey Albié lost their first-round match to the unseeded pair of Pauline Parmentier and Yanina Wickmayer.

Tan made her WTA Tour and Grand Slam main-draw singles debut at the 2018 US Open, where she entered the main draw on a wildcard, losing her first-round match to Eugenie Bouchard, 3–6, 1–6.

Tan made her main-draw singles debut on the WTA Challenger Tour in January 2019 in Newport Beach, where she won her first- and second-round matches (against Katharina Gerlach and Sachia Vickery, respectively) before losing to Taylor Townsend. In May 2019, Tan entered a WTA Tour singles main draw for only the second time in her career in Strasbourg thanks to a wildcard; she lost her first-round match to No. 7 seed, Zheng Saisai, 6–7, 6–7.

In 2022, at her first Wimbledon, ranked No. 115, Tan defeated Serena Williams in three sets with a super tiebreak 7–5, 1–6, 7-6 (10-7) in the first round after 3 hours and 10 minutes, the longest match thus far at the tournament. After that marathon match she withdrew late, only an hour before her match in the doubles' competition prompting her partner Tamara Korpatsch to express, in a since-deleted social media post, her anger and disappointment at not being able to participate in the event on her debut. She continued her good run by beating Sara Sorribes Tormo in the second round and home favorite Katie Boulter in the third. Her run came to an end in the fourth round where she fell to 20th seed Amanda Anisimova, in straight sets.

Performance timelines

Only main-draw results in WTA Tour, Grand Slam tournaments, Fed Cup/Billie Jean King Cup, and Olympic Games are included in win/loss records.

Singles
Current through the 2023 Australian Open.

Doubles

ITF Circuit finals

Singles: 17 (8 titles, 9 runner–ups)

Doubles: 2 (1 title, 1 runner–up)

Notes

References

External links
 
 

1997 births
Living people
French female tennis players
French people of Cambodian descent
French people of Chinese descent
Competitors at the 2018 Mediterranean Games
Mediterranean Games competitors for France
Tennis players from Paris
French people of Vietnamese descent